Tylothrips is a genus of thrips in the family Phlaeothripidae.

Species
 Tylothrips achaetus
 Tylothrips brasiliensis
 Tylothrips caelatoris
 Tylothrips clavivestis
 Tylothrips cochlearius
 Tylothrips concolor
 Tylothrips consobrinus
 Tylothrips crassus
 Tylothrips flaviventris
 Tylothrips forticauda
 Tylothrips fulvescens
 Tylothrips fuscifrons
 Tylothrips gracilis
 Tylothrips indicus
 Tylothrips inuncatus
 Tylothrips longulus
 Tylothrips majusculus
 Tylothrips minor
 Tylothrips osborni
 Tylothrips paulus
 Tylothrips samirseni
 Tylothrips striaticeps
 Tylothrips subglaber
 Tylothrips ustulatus

References

Phlaeothripidae
Thrips
Thrips genera